You've Got to Believe in Something is the third studio album by American rock band Spin Doctors, released in 1996. It is their first album without founding guitarist Eric Schenkman who had left the band during the tour to support their previous studio effort. Schenkman was replaced by Anthony Krizan who co-wrote the album with the rest of the group. "She Used to Be Mine" was released as the first single. An excerpt from the song "If Wishes Were Horses" was used as the theme song for the sitcom Spin City in seasons 2 and 3.

Track listing

Note
Immediately following the bonus track, a brief passage from "I Can't Believe You're Still With Her" is played over and over on a kazoo as Tommy Chong objects.

Personnel
Spin Doctors
Chris Barron – lead vocals, harmonica
Anthony Krizan – guitar, backing vocals
Mark White – bass
Aaron Comess – drums
Additional musicians
Kevin Bents – keyboards on "Where Angels Fear to Tread"
Biz Markie – backing vocals on "That's The Way (I Like It)"
John Bush – congas on "She Used To Be Mine"
Tommy Chong – kazoo
Babi Floyd – backing vocals on "You've Got To Believe In Something", "I Can't Believe You're Still With Her", "She Used To Be Mine" and "If Wishes Were Horses"
Diva Gray – backing vocals on "You've Got To Believe In Something", "She Used To Be Mine" and "If Wishes Were Horses"
Robin Clark – backing vocals on "You've Got To Believe In Something"
Frank Floyd – backing vocals on "You've Got To Believe In Something"
Frankie La Rocka – shaker on "Where Angels Fear To Tread"
Arnie Lawrence – saxophone on "Sister Sisyphus"
Bernie Worrell – keyboards on "You've Got To Believe In Something", "She Used To Be Mine" and "If Wishes Were Horses"
Production
Producers: Peter Denenberg, Danny "Kootch" Kortchmar
Engineer: Peter Denenberg
Assistant engineers: Derrick Garrett, Thom Leinbach, Robert L. Smith, Jr.
Mastering: Ted Jensen
Photography: Paul LaRaia

References

Spin Doctors albums
1996 albums
Albums produced by Danny Kortchmar
Epic Records albums